Iowa Methodist Medical Center is a non-profit, 370-bed hospital in Des Moines, Iowa owned and operated by UnityPoint Health.

History 
Iowa Methodist Medical Center originally opened on January 16, 1901, as Iowa Methodist Hospital, a 30-bed hospital on the former site of Callanan College. In 1956, the hospital performed the first open-heart procedure outside of the Mayo Clinic and also built the first radiation therapy department in Des Moines. Iowa Methodist began operating Life Flight, an air ambulance service, in 1979. The John Stoddard Cancer Center opened in the early 1990s, combining full radiation, oncology, and associated treatments into a single location.

Facilities 
The hospital is home to the William C. Knapp Emergency Department and Trauma Center, an American College of Surgeons-verified Level I trauma center and Level II pediatric trauma center. The hospital houses the Blank Children's Hospital, which contains a pediatric intensive care unit (PICU) and a level III neonatal intensive care unit (NICU). The hospital is also home to the Iowa Methodist Transplant Center, which performs kidney transplants.

References

External links 
 Iowa Methodist Medical Center

Hospitals in Iowa
Hospitals established in 1901
Des Moines, Iowa
UnityPoint Health
Level 1 trauma centers